Elizabeth "Scotti" Lechuga ( Wilborne; born January 7, 1983) is an American former professional racing cyclist, who rode professionally between 2014 and 2018 for the , ,  and  teams. In 2018, Lechuga stepped away from racing and now runs Leborne Coaching, with husband Ernie Lechuga.

Personal life
She is married to former pro racer Ernie Lechuga and they have two sons.

Major results

2015
 2nd Overall Joe Martin Stage Race
1st Stage 4
 10th Overall Tour Femenino de San Luis
2016
 5th Overall Joe Martin Stage Race
 8th Overall Tour of the Gila
 9th Winston-Salem Cycling Classic
2017
 2nd White Spot / Delta Road Race
 7th Overall Tour of the Gila

See also
 List of 2015 UCI Women's Teams and riders

References

External links
 

1983 births
Living people
American female cyclists
Place of birth missing (living people)
21st-century American women